Thomas Meilleur-Giguère (born November 13, 1997) is a Canadian professional soccer player who plays as a defender for Pacific FC.

Club career

FC Montreal
Meilleur-Giguère was part of the Montreal Impact Academy U18 side which finished the 2014/15 U.S. Soccer Development Academy in first place in the overall standings. In February 2016, he was one of four teammates who had a training stint with Bologna F.C. 1909 of Serie A. FC Montreal signed Meilleur-Giguère for their 2016 season in the USL and made his professional debut for the club on March 28 in a 2–0 defeat to Toronto FC II. He score two goals in 21 matches for FC Montreal.

Ottawa Fury
In February 2017 Meilleur-Giguère signed with the Ottawa Fury, the Montreal Impact's new affiliate club. He played four matches for the club during the 2017 season. Meilleur-Giguère signed a first-team contract with Montreal Impact on November 13, 2017. However, on February 28, 2018 he was loaned back to the Ottawa Fury. On February 1, 2019, the Fury announced that Meilleur-Giguère would return on loan from the Impact for the 2019 season. Meilleur-Giguère would have his option for the 2020 season declined by the Impact, ending his time with the club after two seasons.

Pacific FC
On January 21, 2020, Meilleur-Giguère signed with Canadian Premier League side Pacific FC. He made his debut on August 15 against the HFX Wanderers. In January 2022, Pacific announced they had re-signed Meilleur-Giguère to a multi-year contract.

International career
Meilleur-Giguère was called to numerous Canadian U-18 in 2014 and 2015. On March 17, 2016, he was called up to the Canada U20 squad in their two games against England. In August 2016, he was called up to the U-20 team for a pair of friendlies against Costa Rica Meilleur-Giguère was nominated for Canada's U-20 player of the year in 2016. In February 2017, Meilleur-Giguère was named to Canada's roster for the 2017 CONCACAF U-20 Championship Meilleur-Giguère was named to the Canadian U-23 provisional roster for the 2020 CONCACAF Men's Olympic Qualifying Championship on February 26, 2020. He was named to the final squad ahead of the rescheduled tournament in March 2021, but eventually pulled out due to an injury suffered in training.

Honours

Club
Pacific FC
Canadian Premier League: 2021

Career statistics

References

External links

1997 births
Living people
Association football defenders
Canadian soccer players
Soccer people from Quebec
People from Repentigny, Quebec
FC Montreal players
CF Montréal players
Ottawa Fury FC players
Pacific FC players
USL Championship players
Canadian Premier League players
Canada men's youth international soccer players
Homegrown Players (MLS)
FC L'Assomption players